Autumn Roses is a 1943 Spanish film directed by Juan de Orduña, although Eduardo Morera is also credited by some. It is the first feature-length film adaptation of the play of the same name (Rosas de otoño) by Jacinto Benavente; an earlier film adaptation by Morera in 1931, Autumn Roses, was a short.

Cast
 María Fernanda Ladrón de Guevara 		
 Mariano Asquerino 		
 Marta Santaolalla 		
 Luchy Soto 		
 Julia Lajos 		
 Fernando Fernán Gómez 		
 José María Seoane 		
 Luis Prendes

References

External links
 

1943 films
1940s Spanish-language films
Spanish black-and-white films
Films directed by Eduardo Morera
Films directed by Juan de Orduña
Films scored by Juan Quintero Muñoz
1940s Spanish films